The National Soccer League was a soccer league in Canada that existed from 1926 to 1997. Teams were primarily based in the provinces of Ontario and Quebec. The league was renamed to Canadian National Soccer League in 1993 following the folding of the Canadian Soccer League, and the accepting of the Winnipeg Fury, making the league more national. In the 1960s, the Canadian National Soccer League was one of four major leagues in Canadian soccer alongside the Pacific Coast League, the Eastern Canada Professional Soccer League and the Western Canada Soccer League.

It was replaced by the Canadian Professional Soccer League in 1998, after an agreement between the CNSL and the Ontario Soccer Association.

NSL/CNSL Champions

thecnsl.com - Canadian National Soccer Leagu / Update: 6 June 2022  RSSSF - Canadian National Soccer League / Update: 6 June 2022

Titles

NSL/CNSL clubs
Clubs are listed by name and year that a club by that name participated.  Whether clubs by the same name were indeed the same club or not has not been made clear by the source used for compiling this list.  Note as well that the same source does not include information for the Eastern Division of the league from the 1930s through to the 1950s, nor any information at all for the following seasons: 1968, 1969, from 1983 through 1992, and 1994.  Moreover, the source provides only an incomplete list of teams for 1947 through 1949, and, for a few other seasons, not all team names in full.

Bradford Marshlanders (1977–1982 – ?)
Brampton Kicks (? – 1993, ?1994)
Brantford City (1931–1934)
Brantford Cockshutts (1928–1930; 1948)
Buffalo Blazers (1976–1978)
Canadian National Railway (1929–1932)
Corinthians (1928, 1929)
Detroit Besa (1981)
Dynamo Latino (?–1985)
Fergus (1948)
General Motors (1928)
Guelph Taylor-Forbes (1928)
Hamilton Apollos (?1968, ?1969, 1970–1972)
Hamilton Austins (1951)
Hamilton British Imperials (1948)
Hamilton City (1927–1940; 1950; 1973–1975)
Hamilton Cougars (1959)
Hamilton Croatia (?1968, ?1969, 1970–1976)
Hamilton Homer (?1968, ?1969, 1970; 1973–1975)
Hamilton Hungaria (1958)
Hamilton Italo-Canadians (1958–1960; 1972–1979)
Hamilton Primos (1967, ?1968, ?1969)
Hamilton Steelers (1981, 1982)
Hamilton Stelcos (1939, 1940; 1947)
Hamilton Thistles (1927–1938)
Hamilton Westinghouse (1948–1955)
Hamilton White Eagles (1993, 1995)
Kenwoods (1941)
Kitchener Concordia (?1968, ?1969, 1970, ?1971)
Kitchener Kickers (1965, 1966, ?1967, ?1968, ?1969)
Kitchener Maple Leafs (?1971, 1972)
Kosova Albanians (1997)
Liptons (1941)
London City (1973–1997)
London Marconi (1984–1989)
London CNR (1928)
London German Canadians (?1968, ?1969, 1970–1972)
McKinnons (1929)
Montreal Alouettes (1959)
Montreal Cantalia (1958–1960; 1964)
Montreal Carsteel (1927–1948 –?)
Montreal Castors (1975–1978)
Montreal CNR (1928–?)
Montreal Concordia (1960, 1961)
Montreal Hungaria (1959, 1960)
Montreal Maroons (1927)
Montreal Sparta (1958)
Montreal Stars (1979)
Montreal Ukrainians (1959, 1960; 1964)
North York Rockets (1993)
North York Talons (1996, 1997)
Oakville CW (1996)
Oshawa Italia (1962)
Ottawa Sons of Italy (?1968, ?1969, 1970, ?1971)
Ottawa Tigers (?1971, 1972–1978)
Quebec Selects (1974)
Queen City (1962)
Richmond Hill Kick (?–1993, ?1994)
Scarborough Astros (1994?, 1995, 1996)
Serbian White Eagles (1970–1980)
Soccer Portugais du Quebec (1970)
St. Andrews/Earlscourt (1955)
St. Catharines Heidelberg (1971–1978)
St. Catharines (Roma) Wolves (1978–1997) - (St. Catharines Roma 1978–1994; St. Catharines Wolves 1995; St. Catharines Roma Wolves 1996, 1997)
Sudbury (1971)
Sudbury Cyclones (1976–1980)
Sudbury Italia (1965–1967)
Toronto Abruzzi (1964, 1965)
Toronto Azurri (1965)
Toronto Blizzard (1986)
Toronto British Consols (1934–1939)
Toronto Canadian Scots (1957, 1958)
Toronto Canadians (1979)
Toronto City (1948)
Toronto CNR (1928)
Toronto Congasco (1933)
Toronto Croatia (1963–1982 –?–1993; 1997)
Toronto Dimano (1982–?)
Toronto East End Canadians (1949–1956)
Toronto England United (1935–1941)
Toronto Estonia (1962, 1963)
Toronto Falcons (1976–1982 –?)
Toronto First Portuguese (1965–1981)
Toronto Greenbacks (1947)
Toronto Hakoah (1954;  1964, 1965)
Toronto Hellas (1965–1967, ?1968, ?1969, 1970)
Toronto Hungaria (1952–1975)
Toronto Inter-Roma (1967, ?1968, ?1969)
Toronto Italia (1953–1960)
Toronto Italian Virtus (1962, 1963)
Toronto Jets (1995)
Toronto Macedonia (1974–1977)
Toronto Macedonians (1962)
Toronto Malta United (1957, 1958)
Toronto Maple Leafs (1928–1941)
Toronto Maroons (1934)
Toronto Melita (1973–1975)
Toronto Mississauga Hungaria (1977, 1978)
Toronto Oakwoods (1950)
Toronto Olympia (1952–1965)
Toronto Panhellenic (1976–1982 –?)
Toronto Polish White Eagles (1952–1961)
Toronto Polonia (1964; 1973)
Toronto Scottish (1927–1941; 1950–1952)
Toronto Serbians (1979)
Toronto Sparta (1956–1960)
Toronto Supra (1996, 1997)
Toronto St. Andrews (1950)
Toronto Transit Commission (1928–1934)
Toronto Tridents (1954–1960)
Toronto Ukrainia (1977–1981)
Toronto Ukrainians (1950–1967, ?1968, ?1969)
Toronto Ulster United (1927–1941; 1947–1961)
Toronto White Eagles (1967, ?1968, ?1969)
Le Tricolore de Montréal (1955?)
Welland (1948)
Willy Overland (1928)
Windsor Rovers (1927)
Windsor Stars (1975–1978)
Windsor Teutonia (?1965, 1966, 1967–?1968, ?1969)
Windsor Wheels (?–1993, ?1994)
Winnipeg Fury (1993)
Woodbridge (?–1993, ?1994)

See also
 Canadian Soccer League (current)
 Canadian Soccer League (1987–1992)

References

External links
Canadian National Soccer League – RSSSF
thecnsl.com - Canadian National Soccer League

 
Defunct soccer leagues in Canada